The 2017–18 Davidson Wildcats women's basketball team will represent Davidson College during the 2017–18 NCAA Division I women's basketball season. The Wildcats are led by first year head coach Gayle Coats Fulks. The Wildcats were fourth year members of the Atlantic 10 Conference and play their home games at the John M. Belk Arena. They finished the season 12–18, 7–9 in A-10 play to finish in ninth place. They lost in the first round of the A-10 women's tournament to Richmond.

Media

Davidson Wildcats Sports Network
Select Wildcats games will be broadcast on Teamline with Derek Smith and Leslie Urban providing the call. Most home games will also be featured on the A-10 Digital Network. Select games will be televised.

Roster

Schedule

|-
!colspan=9 style="background:#; color:white;"| Exhibition

|-
!colspan=9 style="background:#; color:white;"| Non-conference regular season

|-
!colspan=9 style="background:#; color:white;"| Atlantic 10 regular season

|-
!colspan=9 style="background:#; color:white;"| Atlantic 10 Women's Tournament

Rankings
2017–18 NCAA Division I women's basketball rankings

See also
 2017–18 Davidson Wildcats men's basketball team

References

Davidson Wildcats women's basketball seasons
Davidson
2017 in sports in North Carolina
2018 in sports in North Carolina